The McCall's LPGA Classic was a golf tournament on the LPGA Tour from 1990 to 1995. It was played at the Stratton Mountain Country Club in Stratton Mountain, Vermont.

Winners
McCall's LPGA Classic at Stratton Mountain
1995 Dottie Mochrie
1994 Carolyn Hill
1993 Dana Lofland-Dormann
1992 Florence Descampe

Stratton Mountain LPGA Classic
1991 Melissa McNamara
1990 Cathy Gerring

References

External links
Stratton Mountain Country Club

Former LPGA Tour events
Golf in Vermont
Women's sports in Vermont